Seven-a-side football is one of the minifootball variations of football, which is played among seven players in each team. In the game consists of one goalkeeper and six outfield players. The pitch of seven-a-side football is bigger than that of five-a-side football, ranging from 50-65 yards in length and 25-50 yards in width respectively.

Organisations
IFA7  FIF7

International competitions
 World Cup
 Nations Cup
 Copa America
 World Club Championship
 IFA7 International Challenge

Domestic competitions

Argentina
Super Liga F7 Argentina

Brazil
Futebol 7 Nordeste
Liga Futebol 7 Brazil
NATIONAL FUT7 LEAGUE
RW Futebol 7
Super League 7 Brazil
Super Liga Alagoana Fut 7

Bulgaria
Bulgaria Mini Football League / Мини Футболна Лига

Canada
Soccer League F7 Canada

Costa Rica
Costa Rica Campeonato Nacional 
Costa Rica Liga Nacional
Liga Fút7 Costa Rica

England
London 7-a-side Dream League
 PowerLeague 7-a-side Football League

Guatemala
Liga Fut7 Guatemala

India
Indian Football 7 League

Ireland
F7 Spark Energy Soccer League - Dublin

Malta
Seven-a-side Football Alliance League (SFAL)

Mexico
Liga Fut 7 MX
Liga Futbol 7 Corpus Christi
Liga Futbol 7 Soccer Tlalpan
Super League 7 Mexico

Peru
Super Liga Fútbol 7 Iquitos
Torneo Nacional IFA7

Philippines
7's Football League

Portugal
Superliga Nacional Futebol 7

Singapore
ESPZEN 7-a-side Football League

Spain
Ligas Fútbol 7 Para Todos Madrid
Madrid Fútbol 7 Ligas
Kings League

Thailand
Thailand Soccer 7s

United States
 The Soccer Tournament, a competition with a winner-take-all $1 million prize launching in 2023

Uruguay
Liga Uruguaya Fútbol 7

Vietnam
Hanoi Premier League S7(HPL) (northern teams)
Saigon Premier League S7(SPL) (southeast teams)
Can Tho Premier League S7(CPL) (Mekong Delta teams)
Dak Lak Premier League(DPL) (Central Highlands and Central Coast teams)

Wales
Cardiff Minifootball League

External links 
Seven-a-side football game rules - FIFOS
Seven-a-side football game rules - IFA7
Futseven video: Madureira EC 5 x 5 CR Flamengo - 2013

References

Association football variants